Karapürçek is a town and district of Sakarya Province in the Marmara region of Turkey. The mayor is Orhan Yıldırım (AKP).

References

Populated places in Sakarya Province
Districts of Sakarya Province